The 1900 VFL Grand Final was an Australian rules football game contested between the Melbourne Football Club and Fitzroy Football Club, held at the East Melbourne Cricket Ground in Melbourne on 22 September 1900. It was the 3rd annual Grand Final of the Victorian Football League, staged to determine the premiers for the 1900 VFL season. The match, attended by 20,181 spectators, was won by Melbourne by a margin of 4 points.

Lead-up
Although Melbourne only won six of its fourteen home-and-away fixtures to finish sixth on the ladder, it won its sectional round-robin and defeated the other sectional winner, in the semi-final for the right to face the minor premiers, Fitzroy, in the Grand Final; Fitzroy had won the previous two premierships and was aiming for a third premiership in a row.

The winner of this match would win the premiership.

Teams
Arthur Sowden, and Bill Bowe were unable to play for the Melbourne team, due to injury, and Eric Gardner was unavailable.

 Umpire - Henry "Ivo" Crapp

Statistics

Goalkickers

Melbourne:
 Geddes 1
 Leith 1
 Ryan 1
 Wardill 1

Fitzroy:
 Grace 2
 Barker 1

Attendance
 Crowd - 20,181

See also
 1900 VFL season

Footnotes

References
1900 VFL Grand Final statistics
 The Official statistical history of the AFL 2004
 Ross, J. (ed), 100 Years of Australian Football 1897-1996: The Complete Story of the AFL, All the Big Stories, All the Great Pictures, All the Champions, Every AFL Season Reported, Viking, (Ringwood), 1996. 

VFL/AFL Grand Finals
Grand
Melbourne Football Club
Fitzroy Football Club
September 1900 sports events